SY Equulei, also known as HD 203664, is a single variable star located in the equatorial constellation Equuleus. It has an average apparent magnitude of about 8.5, varying by a few hundredths of a magnitude, making it readily visible in binoculars and small telescopes, but not to the naked eye. At that distance, SY Equulei is dimmed by 0.19 magnitudes due to interstellar dust.

Throughout the late 20th century, HD 203664 was known to have a dust cloud surrounding it. Subsequent observations from Kenneth R. Sembach (1995) reveal it to contain high abundances of calcium as well as traces of magnesium, aluminum, and silicon. The star has a high galactic latitude, indicating its location in the galactic halo. HD 203664 was most likely ejected from its birthplace to its current distance. However, its status as a Beta Cephei variable wasn't discovered until a survey of 2000 using Hipparcos data. It was then given the designation SY Equulei.

SY Equulei has a stellar classification of B0.5 IIIn, indicating an evolved B-type star with nebulous (broad) absorption lines due to rapid rotation.

SY Equueli is a variable star with an amplitude of 0.07 magnitudes and an average period of 3.98 hours. In later observations, SY Equulei was found to have multiple periods.

References

B-type giants
Beta Cephei variables
Equuleus
Equulei, SY
203664
105614
BD+09 04793